The Castello di Agrigento, also known as the Castrum Agrigenti, is a ruined castle in Agrigento, Sicily. In the Middle Ages, it was one of the most important buildings in the city. It was mostly destroyed in 1909, and today only a few remains of the castle survive.

History
The castle began to be built in 1087, when Count Roger ordered the construction of a fort (castellum firmissimum) in Agrigento, which had just been captured from the Arabs. The castle was constructed on top of a hill which had probably been the city's acropolis in antiquity.

In 1150, the Arab historian Muhammad al-Idrisi described the castle as "one of the main strongholds for the attitude of defence" in one of his writings. It was mentioned in a list of state-owned castles in 1273.

The castle was almost completely destroyed to make way for a municipal reservoir in 1909. Very little remains have survived, and the original layout is not discernible. It is located on public property and is in a state of abandonment.

Layout
The exact layout of the castle is not known. Medieval sources suggest that its walls were protected by fortified towers. A drawing in the Atlante di città e fortezze del Regno di Sicilia - 1640 by Francesco Negro and Carlo Maria Ventimiglia shows that the castle was triangular in shape, and had an inner courtyard.

References

Agrigento
Agrigento
Agrigento
Buildings and structures in the Province of Agrigento
Norman architecture in Italy
Buildings and structures completed in 1087
Buildings and structures demolished in 1909